The house of Nicolas Flamel (formerly in ) is a house located at 51 rue de Montmorency in the 3rd arrondissement of Paris.

History 
Nicolas Flamel, a wealthy member of the Parisian bourgeoisie, commissioned the house after the death of his wife Pernelle in 1397, to accommodate the homeless. It was completed in 1407, as is inscribed on a frieze above the ground floor, and it is the best known and sole surviving of Flamel's houses, yet he actually never lived there. The house is probably the oldest in Paris.

Description 

The façade consists of four storeys and has been the subject of successive alterations, particularly during a restoration prior to the 1900 World Fair, when it lost the great wimperg (an ornamental gable) that had given it its name, and had its windows modified.

The ground-floor layout has been changed entirely except for the three front doors. In the past, both side doors granted access to shops, while the central door opened on circular stairs leading to the upper floors. The door jambs are decorated with sculptures framed in basket-handle arches, which depict characters holding phylacteries or sitting in gardens. The central door is framed by four musician angels. Two door jambs feature Nicolas Flamel's initials.

Just below the ground floor cornice is a Middle French inscription:

See also 

 List of monuments historiques in Paris

Notes and references

Bibliography 

 

Houses in Paris
Buildings and structures in the 3rd arrondissement of Paris
Monuments historiques of Paris
Buildings and structures completed in 1407